Acrometopa is a genus of bush crickets in the subfamily Phaneropterinae; It is typical of the tribe Acrometopini.  Species in this genus are found in south-eastern Europe and the Middle East.

Species
The Orthoptera Species File lists:
 Acrometopa cretensis Ramme, 1927
 Acrometopa italica Ramme, 1927
 Acrometopa macropoda (Burmeister, 1838) - type species (as Phaneroptera macropoda)
 Acrometopa servillea (Brullé, 1832)
 Acrometopa syriaca Brunner von Wattenwyl, 1878

References

External links

Phaneropterinae
Orthoptera genera
Orthoptera of Europe